= Turkish Republic =

Turkish Republic may refer to:

- Turkey, informally the "Turkish Republic"
- Northern Cyprus, officially the "Turkish Republic of Northern Cyprus"
